The green parakeet (Psittacara holochlorus) is a medium-sized parrot occurring in North and Central America, from the southernmost tip of Texas south to northern Nicaragua.

Description 
The green parakeet is 32 cm in length, and is mostly green in color. It also has a yellow beak.

Diet
It feeds on seeds, various fruits, and corn. It can sometimes be considered a crop pest.

Habitat
Wild birds primarily use scrub and swamp forests, woodlands, and forest clearings. The US population takes advantage of palm groves in cities.

Taxonomy
This species was formerly placed in the genus Aratinga as A. holochlora, and divided into various subspecies (A. h. holochlora, A. h. brevipes, A. h. brewsteri, A. h. strenua, and A. h. rubritorquis). Later, it was split into three species as the green conure (A. holochlora), Pacific conure (A. strenua), and Socorro conure (A. brevipes). Today it is recognised as single species with a highly threatened subspecies (Psittacara holochlorus brevipes) endemic to Socorro in the Revillagigedo Islands, Mexico.

Ecology
Green parakeet pairs usually find holes in trees in which to nest, where the female lays three or four eggs. It also nests colonially in crevices on cliff faces. After the breeding season is completed, the birds form large communal roosts.

Distribution
The species occurs from southern Texas and northern Mexico (including P. h. brevipes on Socorro Island) south through the Middle American isthmus to southwestern Nicaragua. It inhabits a variety of woody habitats. Since the Carolina parakeet's (Conuropsis carolinensis) extinction and the thick-billed parrot's (Rhynchopsitta pachyrhyncha) extirpation from the United States in the 1930s, the green parakeet remains the only confirmed native extant parrot species in the U.S. Another parrot species, the red-crowned amazon (Amazona viridigenalis) is considered by some authorities to be native to the Rio Grande Valley, but its ecological status is still debated. In western Nicaragua, their nesting sites lie within the El Chocoyero - El Brujo Protected Area, but the birds still face threats from the outside world when they leave the reserve to feed.

The A. brevipes subspecies is highly threatened by habitat loss due to feral sheep and predation by feral cats. Surveys from 2006 and 2007 estimated a population around 300 individuals, suggesting a population decline from previous population estimates.
 
The native status of populations in southern Texas is unclear, with some claiming them to be feral escapees. However, the groups in the Rio Grande Valley are now generally regarded as naturally occurring and native, because of the proximity of confirmed native populations, the deforestation of Tamaulipas which forced them to disperse, and earlier evidence from 1911 of these parakeets consuming a strawberry harvest at Combs.

References

Further reading
National Geographic Field Guide to the Birds of North America 
National Audubon Society The Sibley Guide to Birds, by David Allen Sibley, 

green parakeet
Birds of El Salvador
Birds of Guatemala
Birds of Mexico
Birds of the United States
green parakeet
green parakeet